Parfino is an urban locality (a work settlement) and the administrative center of Parfinsky District of Novgorod Oblast, Russia, located along the Lovat River,  east of Staraya Russa. Municipally, it is incorporated as Parfinskoye Urban Settlement, the only urban settlement in the district. Population:

History

The village of Parfino was first mentioned in chronicles in 1495. The Lovat River was a part of the Trade route from the Varangians to the Greeks, one of the oldest trading routes passing through Rus. The railway station opened between 1895 and 1897 also got the name of Parfino. In 1910, a construction of a plywood factory started between the village and the station of Parfino. Though formally the factory was built on the lands belonging to the village of Zhereslo, the factory settlement became known as the settlement of Parfino. It belonged to Starorussky Uyezd of Novgorod Governorate, and after 1927, to Starorussky District of Novgorod Okrug of Leningrad Oblast. On July 23, 1930 the okrugs were abolished, and the districts became directly subordinate to the oblast. In 1933, Parfino was granted an urban-type settlement status. The area was occupied by German troops between August 1941 and 1943. On July 5, 1944, Starorussky District was transferred to newly established Novgorod Oblast. On December 13, 1968 Parfinsky District was split off Starorussky District, and Parfino became the district center.

Economy

Industry
Parfino is a typical single-industry settlement, where the major employer was Parfino Plywood Combinat, which underwent bankruptcy in the summer 2009.

Transportation
A railway which connects Bologoye and Pskov via Staraya Russa and Dno passes through Parfino.

Parfino is connected by roads with Staraya Russa and with M10 highway which connects Moscow and St. Petersburg.

References

Notes

Sources

Urban-type settlements in Novgorod Oblast
Starorussky Uyezd